The Quincy Quarries in Quincy, Massachusetts, produced granite for over a century and were the site of the Granite Railway—often credited as being the first railroad in the United States. A  section of the former quarries is owned and operated by the Massachusetts Department of Conservation and Recreation as a public recreation area.

History
In 1825, after an exhaustive search throughout New England, Solomon Willard selected the Quincy site as the source of stone for the Bunker Hill Monument in Charlestown.  After many delays and much obstruction, a charter was granted on March 4, 1826, for the construction of a railroad to help move the granite. The "Granite Railway" was designed and built by railway pioneer Gridley Bryant and began operations on October 7, 1826. The granite from these quarries became famous throughout the nation, and stone cutting quickly became Quincy's principal economic activity.

Later use
The last active quarry closed in 1963. After their abandonment, the open quarries filled with rainwater and ground water.  The flooded quarries soon became a popular spot for cliff jumping. However, many people were injured—and killed—while diving into the quarries from great heights. This led the police and the city of Quincy to grapple with what to do with this abandoned space.

During this period, the quarries were also discovered by rock climbers. In 1968, A Guide to Quincy Quarries by Willie Crowther and Tony Thompson, published by the MIT Outing Club, contained information about climbing in and around the quarries; a second edition was published in 1970. Boston Rocks, a guidebook by Larry LaForge, was published by the MIT Outing Club in 1987; a second edition by Richard Doucette and Susan Ruff came out in 2003 with a copyright update in 2008.

During the 1980s old telephone poles and trees were added to discourage cliff jumping.  Unfortunately, these were quickly waterlogged and sank two feet underwater where they were not visible to the cliff jumpers above.  The injury and fatality rate skyrocketed. Often, divers sent to look for missing cliff jumpers would unexpectedly find other bodies instead.

The quarries, once drained of water, became a very popular canvas for graffiti artists.

Quincy Quarries Reservation
In 1985, Boston's Metropolitan District Commission purchased 22 acres, including Granite Railway Quarry, as the Quincy Quarries Reservation. A solution to the public safety problem was finally found with the massive Big Dig highway project in Boston. Dirt from the new highway tunnels was trucked in to fill the main quarries. This opened up new sections of rock to climbers, and the site was subsequently improved to encourage public use of the reservation. The reservation is connected to the trail system of the Blue Hills Reservation and features hiking, rock climbing and views of the Boston skyline.

In popular culture
Scenes from the movies Gone Baby Gone (2007) and The Invention of Lying (2009) were filmed in the Quincy Quarries.

Geeks & Greeks (2016), a graphic novel about pranks at MIT and fraternity hazing, features a climactic sequence set at the Quincy Quarries in their water-filled days.

References

See also 
Granite Railway

Further reading
Journal of Fanny Kemble Friends of the Blue Hills 
Quincy's Granite Legacy Thomas Crane Public Library
Granite Railway, Pine Hill Quarry to Neponset River, Quincy, Norfolk County, MA Library of Congress: Historic American Buildings Survey, Engineering Record, Landscapes Survey

External links

Quincy Quarries Department of Conservation and Recreation
Quincy Quarry Museum

Rail transportation in Massachusetts
Companies affiliated with the Old Colony Railroad
Quincy, Massachusetts
Geography of Norfolk County, Massachusetts
Parks in Norfolk County, Massachusetts
State parks of Massachusetts
Climbing areas of the United States
Tourist attractions in Quincy, Massachusetts
Quarries in the United States
1985 establishments in Massachusetts
Protected areas established in 1985